Gerd Anthoff (born August 12, 1946 in Munich) is a German theatre and television actor.

Biography 
Gerd Anthoff started his acting career in 1967 and became a permanent member of the ensemble at the Bavarian State Theatre in 1970, where among other roles he played Nantwein in the play Der Brandner Kasper for 27 years. He also took part in many TV films and series.

Films and Series 

 1970: Die seltsamen Methoden des Franz Josef Wanninger (1 episode)
 1981: In der Sache J. Robert Oppenheimer (filmed theatre performance)
 1986: Weißblaue Geschichten (2 episodes)
 1987: Professor Bernhardi  (filmed theatre performance)
 1987–2004: The Old Fox (6 episodes)
 1988: Zur Freiheit (2 episodes)
 1988–1995: Derrick (5 episodes)
 1989: Joseph Filser – Bilder aus dem Leben eines Bayerischen Abgeordneten
 1990–1992: Löwengrube – Die Grandauers und ihre Zeit (22 episodes)
 1992: Die Hausmeisterin (5 episodes)
 1992–2003: SOKO 5113 (5 episodes)
 1993–1994: Wildbach (2 episodes)
 1995, 1999: Café Meineid (2 episodes)
 1996: Tatort (1 episode)
 1996–2009: Der Bulle von Tölz (18 episodes)
 1999, 2001: Siska (2 episodes)
 2002–2019: Unter Verdacht 2004: SOKO Kitzbühel (1 episode)
 2004: München 7 (1 episode)
 2004–2006: Zwei am großen See 2008: Die Rosenheim-Cops (1 episode)
 2008–2009: Der Kaiser von Schexing (24 episodes)
 2010:  2012: Das Traumschiff (1 episode)
 2013: Im Schleudergang (6 episodes)
 2019–2020: Reiterhof Wildenstein Awards 
 1995: Bayerischer Fernsehpreis
 2003: Adolf-Grimme-Preis
 2010: Bavarian Order of Merit
 2011: Gold medal München leuchtet'' for his achievements as a Bavarian Actor
 2013: Pro meritis scientiae et litterarum

Sources 
 Internet movie data base.
 Biography at kino.de.
 Gerd Anthoff, der scheue Atheist, in: Süddeutsche Zeitung, December 21, 2016.

20th-century German male actors
German male stage actors
German male television actors
1946 births
Living people